The 2013 Boston mayoral election occurred on Tuesday, November 5, 2013. Incumbent mayor Thomas Menino had declined to run for re-election to a sixth term. A non-partisan preliminary election was held on Tuesday, September 24, 2013. 12 candidates made the ballot to replace Menino, with state representative Marty Walsh and city councilor John R. Connolly advancing to the general election. Walsh was elected to his first term, defeating Connolly by 3% of the vote, and was inaugurated on Monday, January 6, 2014.

Background
Incumbent mayor Thomas Menino had held office ever since ascending to the mayoralty following the resignation of Raymond Flynn in 1993. In 2013, Menino opted against seeking what would have been his sixth elected term as mayor. He announced his decision not to seek reelection on March 27, 2013.

Without an incumbent seeking reelection, this made the 2013 election the first open election since 1984, thirty years earlier. Menino did not endorse a candidate.

Candidates

Candidates who advanced to general election

Candidates eliminated in the primary

Withdrew
 Frank John Addivinola, Jr., candidate for state senate in 2010 and U.S. House of Representatives in 2012 (running for councilor-at-large)
 Lee Buckley
 Robert Cappucci, former Boston School Committee member and retired Boston Police officer (failed to get enough signatures)
 Miniard Culpepper, reverend
 Will Dorcena, activist (failed to get enough signatures)
 Althea Garrison, former state representative (ran for councilor-at-large)
 John Laing, businessman (failed to get enough signatures)
 Divo Rodrigues Monteiro, educator and poet (ran for city council in District 4)
 David Portnoy, founder of Barstool Sports (failed to get enough signatures)
 Gareth R. Saunders, former city councilor (ran for councilor-at-large)
 Hassan A. Williams, candidate for state senate in 2010
 Christopher G. Womack

Declined
 Andrea Cabral, Massachusetts Secretary of Public Safety and Security and former Suffolk County Sheriff
 Sonia Chang-Díaz, state senator
 Richard A. Davey, Massachusetts Secretary of Transportation
 John Fish, CEO of Suffolk Construction Company
 Michael F. Flaherty, former city councillor (ran for City Council At-Large)
 Paul Grogan, president of The Boston Foundation
 Maura Hennigan, Suffolk County criminal courts clerk
 Russell Holmes, state representative
 Stephen J. Murphy, president of the Boston City Council (ran for reelection)
 Tito Jackson, city councillor (ran for reelection)
 Bill Linehan, city councillor (running for reelection)
 Stephen Lynch, U.S. Representative
 Ralph Martin, former Suffolk County District Attorney
 Thomas Menino, incumbent Mayor of Boston
 Matt O'Malley, city councillor (ran for reelection)
 Ayanna Pressley, city councillor (ran for reelection)
 James Rooney, executive director of the Massachusetts Convention Center Authority
 Marie St. Fleur, former state representative
 John M. Tobin, Jr., former city councillor

Primary

Campaign
Incumbent mayor Tom Menino had served since being elected to the position in 1993, making him the longest-serving mayor in Boston's history. The first candidate to announce a campaign for mayor was at-Large Boston City Councillor John R. Connolly in February 2013, who announced an intent to base his campaign on reforming public education and opposing the influence of the Boston Teachers Union. Connolly's campaign was considered to have little chance of succeeding if Menino decided to run for re-election, as the incumbent was highly popular in the city. In March, Menino announced that he would not be seeking re-election, stating that health issues were preventing him from carrying out his tasks as mayor to a satisfactory standard.

Soon after Menino's announcement, state representative Marty Walsh and at-large City Councillor Felix G. Arroyo announced that they would begin mayoral campaigns, both doing so on the same day. Walsh and Arroyo officially began their campaigns on April 10. However, the first candidate to officially join Connolly was Suffolk County District Attorney Dan Conley, who did so on April 3. A day later City Councillor Rob Consalvo of Hyde Park also announced that he would run, while Dorchester activist Bill Walczak did the same on the 7th. Several other candidates, including City Councillors Michael P. Ross and Charles Yancey, former state representative Charlotte Golar Richie, and Boston School Committee member John Barros announced campaigns over the following weeks. In total, 12 candidates made the ballot for the preliminary election.

Connolly’s status as the only mayoral candidate to have announced a campaign before Menino declared that he would not run for re-election gave him an advantage in that it had given him more time to build a campaign apparatus and political platform. Upon his entry into the race Walsh had demonstrated organizational strength by gathering the required signatures to get on the ballot in a single day, which impressed political insiders and showcased the influence of the labor unions who were supporting his candidacy. The advantages enjoyed by the two men led to them being considered the frontrunners for the two spots in the general election in the campaign's early stages.

By mid-September, it was suggested by radio station WBUR-FM that a clear top tier of candidates had arose in the race, consisting of Connolly, Walsh, Golar Richie, Arroyo and Conley. Golar Richie's campaign was viewed as having gained significant momentum by this stage on the race, helped by her status as the most prominent black and only female candidate in the race.

Debates

Endorsements

Polling
Graphical summary

Results

General election

Campaign
Both Connolly and Walsh were felt to be liberal Democrats, with Connolly being perceived as being focused on education and Walsh having the reputation of being the candidate of organised labor. Connolly was considered the frontrunner as the campaign began, as he was more well-known and was considered to have a superior field organisation to Walsh. However, Walsh's campaign was boosted by large spending by labor unions, who were dissatisfied with Connolly due to his staunch support for charter schools. Connolly raised objections to the support that Walsh had received, arguing that it would make him beholden to the unions if he were to win, but he made sure to temper his criticism to avoid alienating labor unions from his campaign completely. Walsh responded to this criticism by arguing that his ties to labor would make him more effective at negotiating contracts and preventing strikes. Walsh's campaign was also boosted by his being endorsed by his preliminary rivals Golar Richie, Barros and Arroyo.

The relative lack of policy differences between the candidates led to the election largely coming down to a contest between biographies and personalities. Walsh supporters derided Connolly as a "corporate lawyer" while Connolly supporters characterised Walsh as a puppet of organized labor. Connolly's base of support largely came from his home neighborhood of West Roxbury and the relatively affluent communities in Boston's west, while Walsh had support from both the more working-class, culturally conservative areas in South Boston and from left-wing activists who had been invigorated by Elizabeth Warren's successful campaign for U.S. Senate the previous year.

Debates

Endorsements
Endorsements in bold endorsed after the primary

Polling
Graphical summary

 ^ Internal poll for John Connolly campaign

With Conley

With Consalvo

With Golar Richie

Results

Walsh defeated Connolly by a narrow margin of 3.5%, with Connolly conceeding and stating he believed Walsh would be a successful mayor. There were a total of 560 write-in votes, the largest recipient of these being baseball player David Ortiz.

See also
List of mayors of Boston, Massachusetts

Notes

References

External links
Felix G. Arroyo - Forward with Felix
John Barros - Vote John Barros for Mayor
Charles Clemons for Mayor of Boston
John Connolly for Mayor of Boston
Dan Conley for Mayor
Rob Consalvo for Mayor
Charlotte Golar Richie for Mayor of Boston
Mike Ross Campaign Website
Bill Walczak for Mayor of Boston
Marty Walsh for Mayor of Boston

Mayoral election
Boston mayoral
Boston
Mayoral elections in Boston
Non-partisan elections
Boston mayoral election